Hugh Edward Holdcroft (c. 1882 – 4 February 1952) was an English footballer who played in the Football League for Burslem Port Vale and Stoke in the early 1900s.

Career
Holdcroft joined Burslem Port Vale in October 1901. His debut came at centre-half in a goalless draw with Preston North End at the Athletic Ground on 8 September 1902. He scored his first goal in the Football League on 25 October, converting a penalty in a 3–3 draw with Burnley at Turf Moor. He became a first team regular for the Second Division side from the next month until he suffered a toe injury in February 1903 and transferred to local rivals Stoke in March 1903. At £500 this was a club record for Stoke.

Holdcroft was converted into a centre forward at the Victoria Ground with mixed success. He hit two goals in a 5–2 win over Liverpool on 17 October 1903, and opened the 1905–06 season with a goal in each of the first three First Division games, but other than these highlights he proved to be far from a natural goalscorer and in three seasons he scored 11 goals in 44 appearances. After retiring due to an ankle injury and later suffering a serious illness that prevented him finding a job, Vale and Stoke held a benefit match on his behalf on 29 April 1907; the game finished 1–1. This would prove to be Burslem Port Vale's final ever match, as the club were dissolved, only to re-emerge later in the year when Cobridge Church renamed themselves Port Vale F.C.

Career statistics
Source:

References

1880s births
1952 deaths
Footballers from Stoke-on-Trent
English footballers
Association football defenders
Association football forwards
Port Vale F.C. players
Stoke City F.C. players
English Football League players